Uri Lifschitz (1936 – 28 May 2011) was an Israeli painter.

Biography

Uri Lifschitz was born on Kibbutz Givat HaShlosha. He served in the Israel Defense Forces paratrooper Unit 101 under Ariel Sharon. He began painting in the 1950s. In the 1960s and 1970s he was one of the founders of the 10 Plus group which posed an alternative to the lyrical abstract style of the New Horizons movement.

Awards and recognition
Lifschitz won the Eugen Kolb Prize from the Tel Aviv Museum of Art in 1965, the Erasmus Prize in 1966 and the Dizengoff Prize in 1985.

References

External links 

Israeli artists
Israeli contemporary artists
1936 births
2011 deaths